Cooper (stylized as COOPER; born Brian Cooper, 1976) is an American artist known for sculptures and assemblages He lives and works in Alaska.

Early life

Cooper was born and raised in Miami, Florida. He changed his name to a mononymous title in all capital letters in 1993.

Career 

Cooper's work has been published in Miami Contemporary Artists by Paul Clemence, Julie Davidow, Elisa Turner, (Schiffer Publishing 2007) and Bonnie Clearwater's book Making Art in Miami, Travels in Hyper-reality (2001 Museum of Contemporary Art), as well as periodicals including Art in America, Sculpture Magazine, Art Papers, ArtNews, The New York Times, The Village Voice, Santa Fe Reporter and The Miami Herald.

In March 2005, the Fredric Snitzer Gallery in Miami exhibited Cooper's solo show titled "Whiskey for a Red Dawn" at which the Museum of Contemporary Art North Miami, acquired a large scale drawing titled "The finest palaces always make the most impressive ruins. So spend your money as fast as possible, and always use some sort of gold appliqué." Art writer Jocelyn Adele Gonzalez comments, "The work is simultaneously humorous and distressing, and at some point lies on the edge of being socio-political. There is indubitably an integration and simultaneity of subjects that intertwine to present the viewer the episteme of the post modern condition where appropriations, simulacrum and parodies go beyond mere pastiche."

In May 2007, Dwight Hackett Projects exhibited a solo show of Cooper's sculpture called "I see a Red Door and want to Paint it Black". This exhibition included the piece titled "Dead Ringer, Low E is the Sound of Black" consisting of a baby grand piano buried underneath the gallery in a makeshift concrete tomb, a live video image of the piano was viewable on a flat screen television above the buried chamber, and a single piano key could be reached by the audience via a ground penetrating sword-like protrusion.

Education 
 1999 MFA University of Alabama, Tuscaloosa, AL
 1997 BFA Pratt Institute, New York, NY
 1995 New World School of the Arts, Miami, FL

Public collections 
 Rubell Family Collection, Miami, FL
 Museum of Contemporary Art, North Miami, FL
 Miami Art Museum, Miami, FL

Awards and honors
 2012: South Florida Cultural Consortium Fellowship for Visual and Media Artists
 2002: Miami-Dade County Site-Specific Arts Commission
 1997: Charles Pratt Scholarship, Pratt Institute, New York City, New York

Additional texts

Books 
2007 Miami Contemporary Artists by Paul Clemence, Julie Davidow, Elisa Turner, Schiffer Publishing 
2005 MOCA and Miami by Bonnie Clearwater, Museum of Contemporary Art 
2001 Making Art in Miami, Travels in Hyperreality by Bonnie Clearwater, Museum of Contemporary Art 
2000 Sarasota Biennial-2000 by Ringling Museum of Art

Periodicals 
2007 Zane Fisher, "Loud and Dirty", The Santa Fe Reporter, May 16
2007 Michael Abatemarco, "Cooper: I see a red door and want to paint it black", THE Magazine, July
2006 Enrique Fernandez, "Miami makes the scene", Miami Herald
2005 Elisa Turner, "Rubell Collection Exhibits Miami Artists", Miami Herald
2005 Alfredo Triff, "Current Shows - Black Lungs", The New Times
2004 Anat Ebgi, "Artist Conversations", NY Arts magazine
2004 "Clearing house", Street Magazine June 11
2003 "Miami: A Dramatic Reinvention", ArtNews February
2003 "Cooper: El Artista como AntiHéro", El Nuevo Herald March 9
2003 "Raw Cooper", Street Magazine April 4
2003 "Cooper: Sculpture Exhibit at Dorsch", The Miami Herald August 17
2002 "Ear Candy in Humid", Street Magazine January 11
2001 Amei Wallach, "In Miami, A Hot Spot of Art, the Temperature is Rising", The New York Times September 16
2001 "Things to See, ART", The Village Voice September 6
2001 Elisa Turner, "Ticket to Ride", The Miami Herald December 20
2001 Damarys Ocana, "An Artistic Ode to Miami", Street Magazine December 22–28
2001 Alfredo Triff, "The Hyperreality of It All", The New Times January 4–10
2001 Carlos Reyes, "Robots Take Over Frederic Snitzer Gallery", MiamiArtExchange.com April
2001 Armando Alvarez Bravo, "Hacer Arte en Miami", El Neuvo Herald January 14
2001 Miguel Sirgado, "Cooper, Aproppiaciones y Licencias", El Nuevo Herald April 15
2000 Paula Harper, "Banking on Art", Art In America May

References

External links 
 Artist website

Artists from Miami
1976 births
Living people
American video artists
American installation artists
Date of birth missing (living people)